Wtorek may refer to:

wtorek - Tuesday in Polish
Wtorek - a Polish movie from 2001

See also 
Wtórek, Ostrów Wielkopolski County